In enzymology, a maleylpyruvate isomerase is an enzyme that catalyzes the chemical reaction

3-maleylpyruvate  3-fumarylpyruvate

Hence, this enzyme has one substrate, 3-maleylpyruvate, and one product, 3-fumarylpyruvate.

This enzyme belongs to the family of isomerases, specifically cis-trans isomerases.  The systematic name of this enzyme class is 3-maleylpyruvate cis-trans-isomerase. This enzyme participates in tyrosine metabolism.

Structural studies

References 

 

EC 5.2.1
Enzymes of known structure